Cornerstone OnDemand, Inc. is a cloud-based people development software provider and learning technology company. The company was publicly traded on the NASDAQ stock exchange under the ticker symbol  until it was acquired by private-equity firm Clearlake Capital in 2021. Cornerstone started as CyberU, which provided online corporate training and education for adults, but eventually shifted focus to human resources software.

History 
Cornerstone OnDemand, Inc. was founded by Adam Miller, Perry Wallack and Steven Seymour in 1999 under the name CyberU and as a learning technology company. It is based in Santa Monica, CA.

The company went public in 2011 on NASDAQ and trades under the symbol CSOD. As of 2017, more than 3000 companies were using the companies software. With the purchase of Saba in 2020, the company expanded to 7000 users.

In 2017, the company received a $300 million investment from Linkedin and Silver Lake.

In August 2021, Cornerstone OnDemand Inc. was acquired by private equity firm Clearlake Capital Group in a deal estimated to be worth $5.2 billion. The new owner will be taking the company private.

Acquisitions

See also 
List of talent management system companies

References

External links

Software companies based in California
Software companies of the United States
Companies based in Santa Monica, California
1999 establishments in California
Companies formerly listed on the Nasdaq
2011 initial public offerings
Software companies established in 1999
American companies established in 1999
2021 mergers and acquisitions